Polynoncus brasiliensis is a species of hide beetle in the subfamily Omorginae found in Argentina, Brazil, and Paraguay.

References

brasiliensis
Beetles described in 1962